Vice Admiral Sir Charles Leo Glandore Evans,  (2 August 1908 – 27 December 1981) was a Royal Navy officer who served as Deputy Supreme Allied Commander Atlantic from 1960 until his retirement in 1962.

Naval career
Evans initially joined the Royal Navy and was given a temporary commission as a flying officer in the Royal Air Force in 1931.

Evans served in the Second World War as Commanding Officer of 806 Naval Air Squadron based at HMS Sparrowhawk carrying out bombing attacks on targets around Bergen in Norway in May 1940 and providing cover for the Dunkirk evacuation the following month.

Evans was appointed Director of the Naval Air Division in 1950, served as Captain of HMS Ocean during the Korean War and then became Commander of the Royal Naval Barracks, Portsmouth in 1954 before being appointed Flag Officer, Flying Training in 1956. He went on to be Flag Officer, Aircraft Carriers in 1959 and Deputy Supreme Allied Commander Atlantic in 1960 before retiring in 1962.

References

1908 births
1981 deaths
Commanders of the Order of the British Empire
Companions of the Distinguished Service Order
Fleet Air Arm aviators
Knights Commander of the Order of the Bath
Recipients of the Distinguished Service Cross (United Kingdom)
Royal Air Force officers
Royal Navy vice admirals
Royal Navy officers of World War II
Royal Navy personnel of the Korean War
Fleet Air Arm personnel of World War II